Chromosome 10 is one of the 23 pairs of chromosomes in humans. People normally have two copies of this chromosome. Chromosome 10 spans about 134 million base pairs (the building material of DNA) and represents between 4 and 4.5 percent of the total DNA in cells.

Genes

Number of genes
The following are some of the gene count estimates of human chromosome 10. Because researchers use different approaches to genome annotation their predictions of the number of genes on each chromosome varies (for technical details, see gene prediction). Among various projects, the collaborative consensus coding sequence project (CCDS) takes an extremely conservative strategy. So CCDS's gene number prediction represents a lower bound on the total number of human protein-coding genes.

Gene list

The following is a partial list of genes on human chromosome 10. For complete list, see the link in the infobox on the right.

Diseases and disorders
The following diseases are related to genes on chromosome 10:

 Apert syndrome
 Barakat syndrome
 Beare–Stevenson cutis gyrata syndrome
 Charcot–Marie–Tooth disease
 Cockayne syndrome
 Congenital erythropoietic porphyria
 Cowden syndrome
 Crouzon syndrome
 Genitopatellar syndrome
 Glioblastoma multiforme
 Hermansky–Pudlak syndrome
 Hirschprung disease
 Jackson–Weiss syndrome
 Multiple endocrine neoplasia type 2
 Nonsyndromic deafness
 Pfeiffer syndrome
 Porphyria
 Spondyloepimetaphyseal dysplasia, Pakistani type
 Tetrahydrobiopterin deficiency
 Thiel–Behnke corneal dystrophy
 Usher syndrome
 Wolman syndrome
 Young-Simpson syndrome

Cytogenetic band

References

External links

 
 

Chromosomes (human)